Robert Douglas Gorman (1 May 1898 – 2 November 1970) was an Australian politician and  a member of the New South Wales Legislative Assembly between 1933 and 1950. During his parliamentary career he was, at various times  a  member of the Labor Party, the Australian Labor Party (NSW) and the Australian Labor Party (Non-Communist) .

Early life
Gorman was born in Glebe, New South Wales and was the son of a master mariner. He was educated at the Patrician Brothers'  School, Glebe and  became a warehouseman and commercial traveller. After 1919, he became an officer of the Shop Assistants Union. Gorman was elected as an alderman of Glebe Municipal Council from 1926 until 1934 and was the mayor in 1933.

State Parliament
Gorman was  elected to parliament as the Lang Labor member for Annandale at the June 1933 by-election caused by the death of the incumbent Lang  Labor member Robert Stuart-Robertson. Gorman retained the seat until it was abolished by a redistribution at the 1950 election. He then attempted to gain Labor pre-selection for the new seat of Newtown-Annandale but was defeated by Arthur Greenup. Gorman was a supporter of the Australian Labor Party (Non-Communist) during the short existence of that manifestation of Lang Labor and was the acting Chairman of Committees (effectively Deputy Speaker) during 2 months in 1949 but did not hold other party, parliamentary or ministerial offices. On leaving parliament, he was appointed as a Commissioner of the Industrial Relations Commission of New South Wales and held that position until he retired in 1963.

References

 

1898 births
1970 deaths
Members of the New South Wales Legislative Assembly
Australian Labor Party members of the Parliament of New South Wales
20th-century Australian politicians
Mayors of The Glebe